Pascal Depierris (born 2 June 1967 in Niort, France) is a former professional footballer. He played as a midfielder.

See also
Football in France
List of football clubs in France

References

External links
Pascal Depierris profile at chamoisfc79.fr

1967 births
Living people
French footballers
Association football midfielders
Chamois Niortais F.C. players
Ligue 1 players
Ligue 2 players